Judeo-Hamadani and Judeo-Borujerdi constitute a Northwestern Iranian language, originally spoken by the Iranian Jews of Hamadan and Borujerd in western Iran.

Judeo-Hamedani Classification 

In western Iran, the district of Hamadan is split between Tuyserkan, Malayer, and Nahavand. This district along with Borujerd, further south in Lorestan Province, forms a geographic cluster that was inhabited by a good portion of Iranian-Jewish communities until recently when those communities emigrated to Tehran, Israel, and North America. Already in 1701, Paul Lucas (cited by De Planhol 2003) wrote that Jews were more numerous in Hamadan than elsewhere in Persia. According to Encyclopedia Iranica, the Jewish community had dwindled from around 13,000 souls in 1920 to less than 1,000 by 1969. It explains that according to members of the community that Donald Stilo encountered in 2001-02, there were only eight people from the Jewish community left in Hamadan at the time. It is hard to find people who still speak the Judeo-Hamadani language since only people born before the mid-1940s were raised speaking the dialect. As Habib Borjian points out, Hamadan was once the capital of Media, implying that a form of Median must have been spoken here before the arrival of Persian (Habib Borjian, 121). Habib Borjian explains that these moribund dialects show closest resemblance to the dialects spoken in the areas of Qazvin and Zanjan, both north of Hamadan, and further northwest in Azerbaijan (Habib Borjian, 121). However, if we look at the historical arrangement of Jewish dialects of Hamadan, we see that they waere originally native only to central Iran. This leads to the implication that only population movements from central Iran could have occasioned the presence of the Jewish dialects in the Hamadan area.

Judeo-Hamedani Grammar 

If we look at the chart below, we can see how Judeo-Hamadani is compared to some of the other Judeo-Median Languages. We find it similar with Kashani, when it comes to passive and imperfective markers. We also find it united with Isfahani and Kashani with throw, want, and cat. With comparison to Isfahani, Judeo-Hamadani is similar with respects to dog. Within the same list we find Hamadani and Borujerdi further share the word sparrow. In terms of morphosyntax, although Hamadani is most similar to Kashani and Isfahani, the differences are sufficient to make mutual understanding quite low. According to Habib Borjian, “Tentative studies reveal that Tuyserkani agrees with Hamadani in all major grammatical points and lexical items (Stilo 2003), and that the dialects of Borujerd and Nehavand15 are close (Yarshater 1989)” (Borjian, 130).

References

Further reading

External links
 Omniglot.com
 Comprehensive History of the Jews of Iran
 Iranian American Jews
 Iranian Jewish Chronicle Magazine
 Judeo Hamadani Speech

Related News Articles
Ancient Judeo-Persian Language Kept Alive

Judeo-Persian languages
Endangered Iranian languages
Jews and Judaism in Persia and Iran